Phyllocnistis citronympha is a moth of the family Gracillariidae, known from Maharashtra and Karnataka, India. The hostplants for the species include Lannea coromandelica and Odina wodier.

References

Phyllocnistis
Endemic fauna of India
Moths of Asia